Cissell is a surname. Notable people with the surname include:

Bill Cissell (1904–1949), American baseball player
Chris Cissell (born 1972), American soccer coach
Howard Cissell (born 1936), American player of Canadian football